This is a list of films produced by the Israeli film industry in 1986.

1986 releases

Unknown premiere date

Awards

See also
1986 in Israel

References

External links
 Israeli films of 1986 at the Internet Movie Database

Lists of 1986 films by country or language
Film
1986